Archaeoprepona amphimachus, the white-spotted prepona,  is a butterfly in the family Nymphalidae. It is found from Mexico to Bolivia. It is found in rainforests and humid deciduous forests at altitudes between sea level and about 1,500 meters.

Some authors consider Archaeoprepona amphimachus to be a subspecies of Archaeoprepona meander.

The wingspan is 50–58 mm for ssp. amphiktion.

Adults feed at sap runs and also attend carrion, dung and rotting fruit on the forest floor. The prepona butterfly is the fastest butterfly in the forest. It can fly from 30–50 mph.

Subspecies
Archaeoprepona amphimachus amphimachus
Archaeoprepona amphimachus pseudmeander (Brazil)
Archaeoprepona amphimachus amphiktion (Honduras, Mexico)
Archaeoprepona amphimachus symaithus (Ecuador, Bolivia, Brazil)
Archaeoprepona amphimachus baroni (Mexico)

External links
Species info

Charaxinae
Fauna of Brazil
Nymphalidae of South America
Butterflies described in 1775
Taxa named by Johan Christian Fabricius